Bashford is both a surname and a given name. Notable people with the name include:

Alison Bashford (born 1963), scholar of the global histories of science, with particular interest in the modern histories of gender and colonialism
Coles Bashford (1816–1878), American lawyer and politician, the fifth Governor of Wisconsin
Gordon Bashford (1916–1991), British car design engineer
Henry Howarth Bashford (1880–1961), distinguished English physician, becoming doctor to George VI
James Whitford Bashford (1849–1919), bishop of the Methodist Episcopal Church in the USA, the first bishop of the Methodist Episcopal Church in China
John Bashford, British sports shooter
Katherine Bashford, American landscape designer
Robert McKee Bashford (1845–1911), American politician and jurist from Wisconsin
William Benjamin Bashford (1875–1955), English-born merchant, farmer and political figure in Saskatchewan
Bashford Dean (1867–1928), American zoologist, specializing in ichthyology, and an expert in medieval armour

See also
Bashford Manor, Louisville, neighborhood in Louisville, Kentucky, USA
Bashford Manor Mall, enclosed mall in Bashford Manor, Louisville, Kentucky
Bashford Manor Stable, American Thoroughbred racing and breeding operation in Louisville, Kentucky
Bashford Manor Stakes, six furlong sprint for two-year-old thoroughbred horses during the Spring meet at Churchill Downs
Robert M. Bashford House, located in Madison, Wisconsin, United States
Wilkes Bashford, upscale store for women and men in the Union Square Shopping District in San Francisco, California
Basford (disambiguation)
Blashford